The 1916 Nebraska gubernatorial election was held on November 7, 1916, and featured bank director and rancher Keith Neville, a Democrat, narrowly defeating Republican nominee, Douglas County District Judge Abraham L. Sutton.

Democratic primary

Candidates
Charles W. Bryan, Mayor of Lincoln
Keith Neville, bank director and rancher

Results

Prohibition primary

Candidates
Julian D. Graves, attorney

Results

Republican primary

Candidates
Walter A. George
William Madgett, Mayor of Hastings
Samuel R. McKelvie, former Lieutenant Governor
Clarence J. Miles, businessman
Abraham L. Sutton, Douglas County District Judge

Results

Socialist primary

Candidates
Benjamin Z. Millikan, railroader and labor union official

Results

General election

Results

References

Gubernatorial
1916
Nebraska